Fade is the debut album by hard rock band Remove Silence, released by Metaledge Records on September 21, 2010. The album was previously released in Brazil under the Dynamo Records label.  Fade was submitted to the Grammy Awards for nomination consideration. The video for the title track has seen major playtime on MTV Brasil.

Track listing

Personnel
Remove Silence
 Hugo Mariutti — Guitars/Vocals
 Ale Souza — Bass/Vocals
 Fabio Ribeiro — Keyboard
 Edu Cominato — Drums

References

2010 debut albums
Remove Silence albums